Silence Observed is a 1961 detective novel by the British writer Michael Innes.  It is the seventeenth entry in his series featuring Sir John Appleby, now an Assistant Commissioner at Scotland Yard. It received a positive review from Anthony Lejeune in the Times Literary Supplement.

References

Bibliography
 Hubin, Allen J. Crime Fiction, 1749-1980: A Comprehensive Bibliography. Garland Publishing, 1984.
 Reilly, John M. Twentieth Century Crime & Mystery Writers. Springer, 2015.
 Scheper, George L. Michael Innes. Ungar, 1986.

1961 British novels
British mystery novels
British crime novels
Novels by Michael Innes
Novels set in London
British detective novels
Victor Gollancz Ltd books